Hugo Hermann Schauinsland (30 May 1857 – 5 June 1937) was a German zoologist born in Rittergut Dedawe, Kreis Labiau, East Prussia.

He studied natural sciences at the University of Geneva and zoology at the University of Königsberg, obtaining his doctorate in 1883. Following graduation he conducted research in Naples and Munich. In 1887 he became Gründungsdirektor (founding director) of the Städtischen Sammlungen für Naturgeschichte und Ethnographie, later to be known as the Übersee-Museum Bremen. Schauinsland served as director of the museum until his retirement in 1933. (succeeded by Carl Friedrich Roewer, 1881–1963).

In 1896–97 he conducted scientific research in the Pacific (including the Hawaiian Islands). The Hawaiian monk seal (Monachus schauinslandi) and the Redspotted sandperch (Parapercis schauinslandii) are named in his honour, as are a number of smaller creatures; (Pseudaneitea schauinslandi, Maorichiton schauinslandi, Caconemobius schauinslandi, Dolomedes schauinslandi).

Selected writings 

 

 - English translation of Drei Monate auf einer Koralleninsel(Laysan)

Taxon named in his honor 
The redspotted sandperch Parapercis schauinslandii is named after him.

See also 
 Ludwig Cohn

References 

19th-century German zoologists
1857 births
1937 deaths
People from the Province of Prussia
University of Geneva alumni
University of Königsberg alumni
20th-century German zoologists